Bruce A. McPherson (born January 7, 1944) is an American politician who served as the 30th California secretary of state from March 30, 2005, to January 7, 2007. He is currently a member of the Santa Cruz County Board of Supervisors.

Early life and education 
McPherson was born and raised in Santa Cruz, California. He attended Santa Cruz High School, where he played football as a running back and baseball as a second baseman. He earned a Bachelor of Science degree in journalism from California Polytechnic State University, San Luis Obispo in 1965.

Career 
Prior to his political career, he worked as the editor of the Santa Cruz Sentinel, a newspaper owned by his family. McPherson served as a member of the California State Assembly from 1993 to 1996 and California State Senate from 1996 to 2004. McPherson was defeated in the 2002 election for Lieutenant Governor of California by incumbent Cruz Bustamante.

He was nominated to replace former Secretary of State Kevin Shelley, who resigned on March 4. McPherson, a Republican from Santa Cruz County, served his term as secretary until January 8, 2007. He was confirmed unanimously by both Democratic-controlled houses of the California State Legislature after being nominated to replace Shelley, a Democrat, by Governor Arnold Schwarzenegger. He lost his bid for a full term to Democrat Debra Bowen in November 2006.

McPherson left the Republican Party in June 2012 to register as "no party preference".

In November 2012, McPherson was elected to the Santa Cruz County Board of Supervisors.

Personal life 
He and his wife have one daughter. Their son, Hunter, was murdered in a 2001 San Francisco street robbery.

Electoral history
1996 California State Senate, 15th District
Bruce McPherson (R) – 47.2%
Rusty Areias (D) – 45.8%
2002 Republican Primary for California Lt. Governor
Bruce McPherson (R) – 86.2%
Ellie Michaels (R) – 13.8%
2002 California Lt. governor
Cruz Bustamante (D), (inc) – 49.4%
Bruce McPherson (R) – 41.8%
2006 California Secretary of State
Debra Bowen (D) – 48.4%
Bruce McPherson (R), (inc.) – 44.8%
2012 Santa Cruz County Board of Supervisors, District 5
Bruce McPherson (N/P) – 50.10%%
Eric Hammer (N/P) – 49.51%

References

External links

Biography from the California League of Women Voters

Man Found Guilty in Death of McPherson’s Son, Sac Union
"Bruce McPherson… where are you?" - a revisited Q&A from Bruce to the residents of Boulder Creek
Join California Bruce McPherson

1944 births
Republican Party California state senators
Living people
Republican Party members of the California State Assembly
People from Santa Cruz, California
County supervisors in California
Secretaries of State of California
21st-century American politicians
20th-century American politicians
California Polytechnic State University alumni
Santa Cruz High School alumni